Sam Bozzo (born February 15, 1969) is an American film director and author.

Overview
Bozzo wrote, directed, and edited three short films. For Which It Stands (1990) was screened in the Sundance Film Festival. The Shadowed Cry (1992) was created as a Top 10 Director assignment for Project Greenlight, run by Matt Damon and Ben Affleck. Holiday on the Moon (1994) won the TriggerStreet.com Short Film competition held at the Toronto International Film Festival, has been screened on the Sundance Channel. Bozzo won a 1994 CINE award for the film.

Bozzo has finished two feature documentaries, one on hackers (Hackers Wanted) and the other Blue Gold: World Water Wars, inspired by the book by Maude Barlow and Tony Clarke.

Films
 For Which It Stands (1990)
 Shadowed Cry (1992)
 Holiday on the Moon (1994)
 Hackers Wanted
 Blue Gold: World Water Wars

References

External links

Blue Gold: World Water Wars

American documentary film directors
1969 births
Living people